Jennifer Cohen may refer to:

 Jennifer Cohen (athletic director) (born 1969), American athletics administrator 
 Jennifer Cohen (fitness) (born 1976), American fitness personality, author, and body image consultant